Old Tennent Church is a Presbyterian church located at 450 Tennent Road in the Tennent neighborhood of Manalapan, New Jersey, United States. The congregation, a member of the Presbyterian Church USA, was founded in 1692 and played a prominent role in the founding of Presbyterianism in America. The current edifice was completed in 1751–1753 and was named in memory of pastors John Tennent and his brother William Tennent. The Old Tennent Cemetery is located on the same property. It is managed by the Old Tennent Cemetery Association.

The church itself is a historic Revolutionary War site. Patriots fought and won victory over the British close by, in the Battle of Monmouth. The church building was used as a temporary hospital for wounded soldiers.

History

The congregation was formed in 1692 by a group of Scottish Dissenters who had fled their homeland to escape James II's severe persecution for their beliefs.  It has occupied the current building since 1751, and the structure has undergone little fundamental change. The church once served as a hospital during an engagement in the American War for Independence—the Battle of Monmouth—which raged around it on June 28, 1778.

Notable burials
 Joshua Huddy – American Revolution patriot.
 Nathaniel Scudder – Signer of the Articles of Confederation from New Jersey and delegate to the Continental Congress.

Soldiers and Sailors Monument 

In 1920, the officers and members of the congregation erected a monument to those who had given their lives in The Great War. The monument has a stone with the names of the fallen as well as the following text... "This monument is dedicated to the memory of the Soldiers and Sailors of monmouth county who sacrificed their lives in the world war 1914–1918. Erected by the Membership and officers of the Old Tennent Church, 1920". An additional verse was engraved apparently years later: "This monument is erected by the Membership and Officers of the Old Tennent Church and Cemetery in grateful memory of the Soldiers and Sailors of Monmouth County who served in the great war, many of whom lie in unknown graves in foreign lands, and in order that the names of the lamented fallen shall be preserved in this sacred and historic place, where their relatives, friends and visitors my see that, after having made the supreme sacrifice for their country, they are not forgotten."

References

External links
 
Monmouth County Tourism
 

Churches in Monmouth County, New Jersey
Presbyterian churches in New Jersey
Manalapan Township, New Jersey
Churches completed in 1753
1753 establishments in New Jersey
New Jersey in the American Revolution
Pre-statehood history of New Jersey
18th-century Presbyterian church buildings in the United States